WMRR (101.7 FM, "Rock 101-7") is a radio station broadcasting a classic rock format. Licensed to Muskegon Heights, Michigan, it first began broadcasting under the WKJR call sign.

WMRR identifies itself hourly with the slogan Broadcasting from the Beer Tent Capital of the World. This reference was coined by then Program Director, Don Beno, and now serves as an unofficial nickname for the city of Muskegon, Michigan.

History
101.7 began as WKJR-FM in 1974, sister station to the now-defunct WKJR AM 1520. At the time, both stations were formatted with Christian programming and owned by the Kuiper family which also owned WFUR-AM and FM in Grand Rapids and WKPR in Kalamazoo. In the early 1980s WKJR-FM separated programming to air a beautiful music format as WABM.  The Kuiper family sold the station in 1986 to Goodrich Radio, which at the same time acquired competitor easy listening station 104.5 WQWQ; Goodrich moved the WQWQ calls and format to 101.7 and launched a Top-40 format as "104.5 Sunny-FM" with the calls WSNX.  Coinciding with an industry trend away from the Beautiful Music/Easy Listening format as its demographics became older and unsalable, 101.7 WQWQ moved to Adult Contemporary as WQFN "Fun 101.7" in 1990, back to the WQWQ calls and easy format a year later, and then to Album Oriented Rock as WMRR in 1992.

HD programming
WMRR transmits in HD Radio and features:
HD1 - a digital simulcast of the traditional analog signal - Rock 101.7.
HD2 - not presently in use. A variety of formats had aired on this channel, but in September 2022, the HD2 service was terminated.

References

External links

Michiguide.com - WMRR History

MRR
IHeartMedia radio stations
Muskegon County, Michigan
Classic rock radio stations in the United States
Radio stations established in 1974